Potarch is a hamlet in Aberdeenshire, Scotland, with a bridge across the River Dee.

It is a popular location with tourists and day-trippers, and has a hotel.

The Dinnie Stones are kept at the Potarch Hotel. The Dinnie Stones are a pair of Scottish lifting stones.

References

Hamlets in Scotland
Villages in Aberdeenshire